Natural Causes is a 1994 American political action thriller film directed by James Becket and written and produced by Jake Raymond Needham. It stars Janis Paige, Ken Wisan, Joke Tachalom, Popin Kukiatto, Tim Thomerson, Linda Purl, Kenneth Brady, Somsak Pansene, Mathee Sirijantra, and Robert Radford as former Secretary of State Henry Kissinger.

Plot
A plot involving Vietnamese refugees is linked to the death of an American's mother in Bangkok.

Cast
 Janis Paige as Mrs. MacCarthy
 Ken Wisan as Nguyen
 Joke Tachalom as Guard
 Popin Kukiatton as Ice Cream Vendor
 Tim Thomerson as The Westerner
 Linda Purl as Jessie MacCarthy
 Robert Radford as former Secretary of State Henry Kissinger
 Kenneth Brady as Kissinger's Advisor
 Somsak Pansene as General Giap
 Mathee Sirijantra as Thai Foreign Minister
 Komson Bhibalkul as Security Man
 James Murphy as Diplomat
 Umporn Pankratork as Male Servant
 Ali MacGraw as Fran Jakes
 Kasem Poungkaew as Police Clerk
 Cary-Hiroyuki Tagawa as Major Somchai
 Manop Siangsodsai as Temple Clerk
 Chokechai Tanitkul as Vietnamese #1
 Will Patton as Michael Murphy
 Chalerm Tongkrajang as Vietnamese #2
 Usana Pubhitak as Ticket Agent
 Jeremy Harrington as TV Correspondent
 Natayada Na Songkhl] as Tall Man
 Siraya Chunekamrai as Thai Bartender
 Narinporn Narvrin as No #31
 Jerome Gillis as Marine Guard
 Eric Rosser as Embassy Employee
 Marc Anthony as Marine Guard
 Ryan Young as Blond Man

Reception

Critical response
Emanuel Levy, of Variety states in his review: "Set in Bangkok, Natural Causes is a messy, incoherent political thriller about a young American woman who finds herself in the midst of a plot to assassinate former Secretary of State Henry Kissinger. Pic makes good use of Bangkok's colorful scenery, but its roguish, muddled plot and maladroit, uninvolving direction should take it straight to video domestically, with some possibilities for theatrical release offshore."

Release
Natural Causes was shown at the Santa Barbara International Film Festival on March 5, 1994. It was released direct-to-video in the United States by Columbia TriStar Home Video on November 7, 1995.

References

Sources

External links
 
 

1994 films
1994 action thriller films
1994 direct-to-video films
1990s political thriller films
American action thriller films
American political thriller films
Cultural depictions of Henry Kissinger
Direct-to-video action films
Direct-to-video thriller films
Films scored by Nathan Wang
Films set in the 1970s
Films set in Bangkok
Films set in Vietnam
Sony Pictures direct-to-video films
1990s English-language films
1990s American films